Natalia Lobova (born 3 September 1986) is a Russian sprint canoer who has competed since the late 2000s. She won two silver medals, both in the K-1 4 × 200 m event, at the 2011 and 2014 World Championships, and bronze medals in the K-1 4 × 200 m event at the 2010 ICF Canoe Sprint World Championships in Poznań, and in the K-1 200 m relay at the 2013 World Championships. At the 2011 Canoe Sprint European Championships she won the gold medal at the K-1 200m race.

External links
Canoe'09.ca profile.

1986 births
Living people
Russian female canoeists
Canoeists at the 2012 Summer Olympics
Olympic canoeists of Russia
ICF Canoe Sprint World Championships medalists in kayak
People from Engels, Saratov Oblast
Sportspeople from Saratov Oblast